A New Stereophonic Sound Spectacular is the debut studio album by the Belgian band Hooverphonic. The album was released by Columbia Records on 29 July 1996, initially credited to the band's original name, Hoover. It is Hooverphonic's only album with lead singer Liesje Sadonius.

A New Stereophonic Sound Spectacular produced the singles "Wardrope", "2Wicky", "Inhaler", and "Barabas". On 15 April 1997, the album was released in the United States by Epic Records. By June 1998, it had sold over 140,000 copies worldwide.

In 2011, a deluxe edition of A New Stereophonic Sound Spectacular was released as a box set including the original album on both CD and LP, two bonus CDs containing remixes and rarities from the era, artwork prints, and a book of essays by the members of Hooverphonic about the album.

Composition
The song "2Wicky" samples Isaac Hayes' 1969 rendition of "Walk On By", as well as "Le Voile d'Orphée" by Pierre Henry.

"Plus Profond" was reworked for A New Stereophonic Sound Spectacular from its original version, which contained a sample that could not be cleared. This version would later be performed live by Hooverphonic on their New Stereophonic Spectacular tour in 2006, and it was eventually released on the 2011 deluxe edition of A New Stereophonic Sound Spectacular.

Track listing

Sample credits
 "2Wicky" contains samples of "Walk On By", written by Burt Bacharach and Hal David and performed by Isaac Hayes; and "Le Voile d'Orphée", written and performed by Pierre Henry.
 "Plus Profond" (original recording) contains samples of "007 and Counting", performed by John Barry.

Personnel
Credits are adapted from the album's liner notes.

Hooverphonic
 Liesje Sadonius – vocals
 Raymond Geerts – guitars, breaths
 Frank Duchêne – engineering, keyboards
 Alex Callier – programming, keyboards

Additional musicians
 Eric Bosteels – drums on "Inhaler", "Nr 9", "Sarangi", "Revolver" and "Innervoice"
 Stefan Bracoval – flute on "Wardrope"
 Sven Muller – bass on "Cinderella"
 Charlotte Van de Perre – Spanish parlando vocals on "Cinderella"
 Ursi Vanderherten – French parlando vocals on "Plus Profond"

Production
 Benjamin Bertozzi – mixing (assistant) on "Plus Profond"
 Ian Cooper – mastering
 Jake Davies – mixing (assistant), analogue tape phasing
 Kees de Visser – mastering on "Wardrope", "Barabas" and "Sarangi"
 Roland Herrington – mixing
 Hooverphonic – production, engineering, mixing on "Plus Profond"

Design
 Power & Glory – cover design

Charts

References

External links
 

1996 debut albums
Hooverphonic albums
Columbia Records albums
Epic Records albums